TC-1827 is an orally active, selective agonist of the α4β2 nicotinic receptors. Administration of TC-1827 improved memory and learning in a variety of rodents and increased long-term potentiation in hippocampal slices. In addition, the compound was without significant cardiovascular side effects, except for a small, transient rise in arterial blood pressure. The pro-cognitive effects of TC-1827 last much longer than the short half life (0.2 - 1.0 hours) would suggest.

References

Nicotinic agonists
Nootropics
Pyrimidines